Sir Colin Malcolm MacGregor (April 10, 1901 – September 6, 1982) was Chief Justice of Jamaica from 1957 to 1962. He was the first chief justice to be native born. 

He was a deacon of the Anglican church.

He was knighted on June 13, 1959. 

The Colin MacGregor Memorial Prize is awarded in his memory to outstanding law students by the University of the West Indies.

References 

1901 births
1982 deaths
Chief justices of Jamaica
Jamaican knights
20th-century Jamaican judges